Jiya may refer to:

People 
 Ayanda Jiya (born 1987)
 Edith Jiya (born 1972)
 Mamman Jiya Vatsa (1940–1986)
 Jiya Shankar (born 1995)

Other 
 Jiya (book), a Japanese bunkoban
 Jiya Jale, an Indian television series
 Jiya Jale: The Stories of Songs a 2018 book by Nasreen Munni Kabir
 Jiya Jaye, a 2017 Indian Hindi-language film
 Jiya Township, a township in Xinjiang, China

See also